Adolf Schepp (1837 – 9 March 1905) was a German mathematician who translated several mathematical works from English and Italian into German.

References

19th-century German mathematicians
German male non-fiction writers
1837 births
1905 deaths
19th-century German translators